Joseph Félix H. Arsenault (February 15, 1866 – January 28, 1946) was a merchant and political figure in Prince Edward Island. He represented 3rd Prince in the Legislative Assembly of Prince Edward Island from 1904 to 1908 as a Liberal member.

Biography
He was born in Urbainville, Lot 14, the son of Herbert Arsenault, and was educated in Egmont Bay. Arsenault lived in the United States for a few years before returning to the island and opening a general store and a lobster cannery. Arsenault was a justice of the peace. He was also a postmaster. He married Emily Bernard in 1892. Arsenault was an unsuccessful candidate in 1900, running against Joseph-Félix Arsenault. He was defeated by Aubin-Edmond Arsenault when he ran for reelection in 1908. Arsenault died in Charlottetown at the age of 79.

References 

1866 births
1946 deaths
People from Prince County, Prince Edward Island
Prince Edward Island Liberal Party MLAs